YSK 757 Karimun or Yayasan Sepakbola Karimun 757 was an Indonesian football club based in Karimun Regency, Riau Islands, and nicknamed "The Captains". They used to play in the Liga Nusantara. The club was merged with PS Bintang Jaya Asahan in 2017 to form 757 Kepri Jaya F.C.

Honours 
 Liga Nusantara Riau Islands Region
 Winners: 2016

References

External links
YSK 757 Karimun at indonesiansc.com

Defunct football clubs in Indonesia
Football clubs in Indonesia
2017 disestablishments in Indonesia